This is a list of rulers of Iceland, ruling from 1262 to 1944.

Iceland was settled in the late 9th and early 10th centuries, principally by people of Norwegian and other Scandinavian origin. In 930, the ruling chiefs established a republican constitution and an assembly called the Althing—the oldest parliament in the world. Iceland remained independent until 1262, when it entered into a treaty which established a union with the Norwegian monarchy. In the late 14th century Norway and Denmark entered into a union. The union between Denmark and Norway, ignoring some shorter periods, lasted until 1814, when Norway briefly gained independence, and Iceland became an integral part of Denmark until 1918, when Iceland was recognised as a fully sovereign state in personal union with Denmark under a common monarch, on 1 December that same year.

Following a constitutional referendum between 20 and 23 May 1944, Iceland formally became an independent republic on 17 June 1944. Since Denmark was still occupied by Germany, many Danes felt offended that the step should have been taken at the time . Still, the last King of Iceland, Kristján X, sent a message of congratulations to the Icelandic people.

Possession of Norway (1262–1814)

Possession of Denmark (1814–1918)

Kingdom of Iceland (1918–1944)

Republic of Iceland (1944—present)

See also
Jørgen Jørgensen, Jörundur hundadagakonungur ("Jørgen the dog-days King" in Icelandic), a Danish adventurer that proclaimed himself temporary king during some months of 1809.
List of Norwegian monarchs
List of Danish monarchs
List of Swedish monarchs
List of Finnish monarchs
List of Greenlandic rulers

Notes

Kings of Iceland
List of rulers
Iceland
Rulers